Caroline was launched at Philadelphia in 1800. She was taken in prize. New owners retained her name and she appeared in British records from 1813. From 1820 on she was based at Hobart in Van Diemen's Land. From there she sailed to and from Port Jackson and on seal hunting voyages to Macquarie Island.  She departed on a sealing voyage in November 1824 and wrecked at Macquarie Island on 17 March 1825; her crew were rescued some five months later.

Career
Caroline first appeared in Lloyd's Register (LR) in 1813.

Lloyd's List (LL) reported on 26 August 1814 that Caroline, Allen, master, had been returning to London from Demerary when she grounded on the Bembridge Ridge. It was expected that she would be gotten off. On 25 August she was gotten off after some of her cargo had been removed. She was taken into Portsmouth. 

On 6 March 1818 Caroline, Serjeant, master, sailed from Demerara but grounded on one of the banks. She had to put back and it was expected that she would be detained until spring.

On 3 August 1820, Caroline, Taylor, master, arrived at Plymouth from London. She sailed on 8 August, bound for New South Wales. She arrived there, and then on 3 January 1821 Caroline, Taylor, master, sailed from Port Jackson for the Derwent River. On 30 May she was back at New South Wales from Hobart Town.

On 15 November Caroline sailed for the South Shetland Islands; she arrived there on 19 December 1821. On 3 February 1822 Caroline, Taylor, master, from Port Jackson, was reported to be there with 500 seal skins. However, by 25 February she was at Valparaiso, having come from the Juan Fernández Islands. On 15 February 1823 Caroline returned from her 16-month long sealing and whaling voyage. She was last from Macquarie Island. 

On 17 April she sailed for Macquarie Island to hunt elephant oil and skins. My mid-July she was back at Hobart Town. On 2 October she again sailed for Macquarie Island. On 1 January 1824 she returned with a full cargo of oil. On 30 January she arrived at Sydney from Macquarie Island with a full cargo of sea-elephant oil.

On 4 March Caroline sailed for the sperm whale fishery. On 22 April she returned from Macquarie Island with 90 tons of elephant oil. On 4 July Caroline sailed for Hobart and Île de France. By 28 August she was in the River Derwent. On 1 September she arrived at Sydney with 3150 bushels of wheat from Launceston, Tasmania.

Fate
Caroline departed from Port Jackson on 17 November 1824, bound for Macquarie Island. 

Caroline, Taylor, master, was totally lost in March 1825, together with her cargo, on the west coast of Macquarie Island. A gale had driven her ashore. Some 90 tons of her cargo of 130 tons of elephant seal oil were lost, but all aboard survived. Some five months later Wellington brought Taylor and his crew back to Sydney. About a month later  brought Carolines surviving whale oil from Macquarie Island back to Tasmania.

Lloyd's Register
Between 1823 and 1826 LR apparently carried duplicate entries for Caroline. These entries had some inconsistencies with each other and with the Register of Shipping (RS) concerning Carolines burthen, and place and year of origin.

Citations and references
Citations

References
 

1800 ships
Ships built in Philadelphia
Captured ships
Age of Sail merchant ships of England
Sealing ships
Maritime incidents in March 1825